Ritter is an unincorporated community in O'Brien County, Iowa, United States.

History
Ritter was platted when the Chicago, Minneapolis & St. Paul Railroad was extended to that point. The community was named for J. L. Ritter, a railroad dispatcher.

References

Populated places in O'Brien County, Iowa
Unincorporated communities in Iowa